Junggo is a populated place in Batu, East Java, Indonesia.

References

Batu, East Java
Populated places in East Java